Qaiser Ali (born 28 December 1978) is a Canadian cricket player. He played one ListA match for karachi B in his native Pakistan in 1995, but moved to Canada later in life.

He made his debut for Canada in the ICC Intercontinental Cup against Bermuda, and has played four matches in the competition in all. He also played two One Day Internationals against Kenya in August 2006.

1978 births
Canada One Day International cricketers
Living people
Pakistani emigrants to Canada
Naturalized citizens of Canada
Ali
Pakistani cricketers
Rawalpindi B cricketers
Cricketers from Rawalpindi
Canadian cricketers